Weidel is a surname. Notable people with the surname include:

 Alice Weidel (born 1979), German politician (AfD)
 Gustaf Weidel, né Johnsson (1890–1959), Swedish diplomat and gymnast
 Hugo Weidel (1849–1899), Austrian chemist
 Johann Weidel (1904–?), Swiss boxer
 Karl Weidel (1923–1997), American politician

German toponymic surnames